Endoclita sibelae is a species of moth of the family Hepialidae. It is known from the Moluccas (Bacan).

References

External links
Hepialidae genera

Moths described in 1935
Hepialidae